David Gutiérrez Gutiérrez (born 2 April 1982) is a Spanish former professional cyclist.

Major results

2004
1st Overall Semana Aragonesca
1st Stage 3
2005
1st Stage 2 Volta de Castello
1st Stage 1 Vuelta a Salnes
1st Stage 2 Vuelta a Cantabria
2006
1st Overall Vuelta a Salamanca
1st Stage 2
1st Stage 3 Volta a Tarragona
1st Stage 5 Vuelta Ciclista a León
2007
1st Overall Vuelta a Zamora
1st Stage 3 Volta de Castello
1st Stage 2 Tour of Galicia
1st Stage 4 Copa Iberica
1st Stage 3 Vuelta a Salamanca
2008
1st Stage 3 Volta a Coruña
1st Stage 2 Volta a Tarragona
1st Stage 5 Semana Aragonesca
2009
1st Memorial Avelino Camacho
1st Stage 2 Volta da Ascension
1st Stage 5 Circuito Montañés
1st Stage 1 Vuelta a Segovia
1st Stage 1 Vuelta a Zamora
1st Stage 1 Vuelta a Salamanca

References

External links

1982 births
Living people
Spanish male cyclists
Sportspeople from Las Palmas
21st-century Spanish people